Andrée Brunin (13 February 1937, La Madeleine, Nord, - 1 April 1993, Bavinchove, Dunkirk) was a French poet, children's writer and novelist.

Selected works
Fille du Vent, poems (Nomad's Land, Paris, 2003)
La pensée, story for children
Histoire du petit bonnet, story for children
Songs of Holidays
La Pluie verse des larmes d'argent, novel

Bibliography
Anderson, Jill (Dr, University of Melbourne): "Andrée Brunin, une voix de la Flandre Française", Annales du Comité Flamand de France, 2000
Brunel-Lobrichon, Geneviève (Dr, University of Paris-Sorbonne): "Échos et profondeurs: des trouvères aux poètes de Flandre", Annales du Comité Flamand de France, 2008

References 

1937 births
1993 deaths
People from La Madeleine, Nord
20th-century French poets